Ohel Ya'akov Synagogue, located in Zikhron Ya'akov, a town in the Haifa District of Israel, was established in 1886 by Baron Edmond James de Rothschild. 

Rothschild commissioned the construction the synagogue in memory of his father Jacob Mayer de Rothschild. It was completed in 1884. Its name, Ohel Yaakov, means "Tent of Jacob" and alludes to the biblical Jacob, who "dwelled in tents" according to Genesis 25:27. The synagogue, which has a large main section for men and a second-floor, wraparound women's section, has a Holy ark made of white marble and marble interior walls.

References

External links
Ohel Yaakov Synagogue on Attractions in Zichron Ya'akov, Israel

Gothic Revival synagogues
Religious organizations established in 1886
Orthodox synagogues in Israel
Gothic Revival architecture in Israel
Jews and Judaism in Haifa
Religious buildings and structures in Haifa
Synagogues completed in 1884
Edmond James de Rothschild